The 1972–73 QMJHL season was the fourth season in the history of the Quebec Major Junior Hockey League. The summer of 1972 saw the departure of the Saint-Jérôme Alouettes and the Verdun Maple Leafs from the league, reducing the circuit to eight teams. In an off-season lawsuit between the QMJHL and the OHA, the QMJHL gained a team, when the Montreal Junior Canadiens transferred leagues.

Michel Brière Memorial Trophy is first awarded to the league's most valuable player in honour of Michel Brière, who was killed in a car accident. Nine teams played 64 games each in the schedule. The Quebec Remparts finished first place in the regular season, and won the President's Cup, defeating the Cornwall Royals in the finals.

Team changes
 The Saint-Jérôme Alouettes cease operations.
 The Verdun Maple Leafs cease operations.
 The Montreal Junior Canadiens transfer from the Ontario Hockey Association to play in the QMJHL as the Montreal Bleu Blanc Rouge.

Final standings
Note: GP = Games played; W = Wins; L = Losses; T = Ties; Pts = Points; GF = Goals for; GA = Goals against

complete list of standings.

Scoring leaders
Note: GP = Games played; G = Goals; A = Assists; Pts = Points; PIM = Penalties in minutes

 complete scoring statistics

Playoffs
Andre Savard was the leading scorer of the playoffs with 42 points (18 goals, 24 assists).

Quarterfinals
 Quebec Remparts defeated Trois-Rivières Ducs 4 games to 0.
 Cornwall Royals defeated Montreal Bleu Blanc Rouge 4 games to 0.
 Sorel Éperviers defeated Laval National 4 games to 1.
 Sherbrooke Castors defeated Shawinigan Bruins 4 games to 0.

Semifinals
 Quebec Remparts defeated Sherbrooke Castors 4 games to 0.    
 Cornwall Royals defeated Sorel Éperviers 4 games to 1.

Finals
 Quebec Remparts defeated Cornwall Royals 4 games to 3.

All-star teams
First team
 Goaltender - Paul-Andre Touzin, Shawinigan Bruins
 Left defence - Al Sims, Cornwall Royals
 Right defence - Jean Landry, Quebec Remparts
 Left winger - Francois Rochon, Sherbrooke Castors
 Centreman - Andre Savard, Quebec Remparts
 Right winger - Jacques Cossette, Sorel Éperviers
 Coach - Claude Dolbec, Shawinigan Bruins
Second team 
 Goaltender - Andre Lepage, Drummondville Rangers 
 Left defence - Jean-Pierre Burgoyne, Shawinigan Bruins
 Right defence - Jean Bernier, Shawinigan Bruins 
 Left winger - Claude Larose, Drummondville Rangers 
 Centreman - Denis Desgagnes, Sorel Éperviers
 Right winger - Blair MacDonald, Cornwall Royals
 Coach - Orval Tessier, Quebec Remparts
 List of First/Second/Rookie team all-stars.

Trophies and awards
Team
President's Cup - Playoff Champions, Quebec Remparts
Jean Rougeau Trophy - Regular Season Champions, Quebec Remparts

Player
Michel Brière Memorial Trophy - Most Valuable Player, Andre Savard, Quebec Remparts
Jean Béliveau Trophy - Top Scorer, Andre Savard, Quebec Remparts
Jacques Plante Memorial Trophy - Best GAA, Pierre Perusse, Quebec Remparts
Michel Bergeron Trophy - Rookie of the Year, Pierre Larouche, Sorel Éperviers
Frank J. Selke Memorial Trophy - Most sportsmanlike player, Claude Larose, Drummondville Rangers

See also
1973 Memorial Cup
1973 NHL Entry Draft
1972–73 OHA season
1972–73 WCHL season

References
 Official QMJHL Website
 www.hockeydb.com/

Quebec Major Junior Hockey League seasons
QMJHL